Melbourne bus route 601 is a bus route operated by CDC Melbourne between Huntingdale station and Monash University, Clayton campus in Melbourne, Australia.

History
Prior to opening the route there were numerous complains about the lack of service from Huntingdale station to the Monash University, Clayton campus as both routes 630 and SmartBus 900 failed to provide sufficient service to meet demand.

Eastrans commenced operating route 601 on 18 July 2011 as transport option for students and staff at Monash University to travel to the campus more quickly and efficiently, initially the route was launched as a trial run for one year.

In the first year of operations the route has become very successful and also doubled patronage on the corridor, due to the success it was evident that the route would be staying. 

As at 2014, The route was Melbourne's busiest with an average weekly patronage of 22,000. If the Suburban Rail Loop is constructed, the route will likely be connected with the line at Monash University via Monash station. In 2022 route 601 was chosen by CDC Melbourne to operate trial runs for new electric buses.

Route
Route 601 operates from Huntingdale station to Monash University via North and Wellington Roads. Journey times for the 2.5 kilometre trip is five minutes on average. It is one of the most used in Melbourne with buses usually being crowded even during peak frequencies with buses arriving every few minutes.

Vehicles
Route 601 was initially operated by a dedicated fleet of three Volgren bodied Volvo B7RLEs painted in a white and orange livery. More recently it has been operated buses in standard Public Transport Victoria livery. In December 2022 Volgren bodied Volvo BZL electric buses were introduced with Australia’s first offsite bus charging station installed at Monash University.

References

Bus routes in Australia
Monash University